English singer and songwriter Ella Henderson has recorded songs for two studio albums and two extended plays (EPs). She has also written for other artists, as well as featured on a number of singles as a guest vocalist. She began playing piano at the age of eleven and writing songs at thirteen. Her Scottish paternal grandfather was a source of inspiration for the singer. In 2012, at the age of 18, Henderson entered series nine of the X Factor (UK), finishing up seventh after losing a sing off with eventual winner James Arthur. Henderson became the opening act for his 2017 tour Back from the Edge and they co-write the 2021 song "Let's Go Home Together". Following her stint on the X Factor, Henderson signed with Simon Cowell's record label Syco Music and began work on her debut album. Chapter One was released in October 2014, topping the UK Albums Chart and spawning four singles. Henderson co-wrote all but one of the songs on Chapter One, including her debut single "Ghost" which topped the UK Singles Chart, "Yours" which reached number sixteen and "Mirror Man". The only song not written by Henderson was her second single "Glow", which reached number seven in the UK.

Although a second album was in production in 2016, Henderson experienced severe anxiety and ill mental health, resulting in a long delay between her first and second albums. During this time, she departed Syco Music in favour of a new deal with Major Tom's, the record label founded by British drum and bass band Rudimental. Between 2015 and 2019, Henderson appeared on high profile releases from other artists including Sigma's "Glitterball", Kygo's "Here for You" and "Hold Me Close" by Sam Feldt. In 2019, Henderson released the EP Glorious, which she co-wrote. In 2021, Henderson released the aforementioned song "Let's Go Home Together", now re-recorded as a duet with Tom Grennan as opposed to Arthur who had co-written and originally featured on the song. It would feature on Henderson's second album Everything I Didn't Say, along with the single "Brave", and promotional singles including the title track and an EP for the song "Ugly". According to Henderson, for the production of her second album, she wrote over 400 songs.

She has a wide range of collaborators across her discography including production outfit TMS, Richard "Biff" Stannard and Noel Zancanella (of the band OneRepublic) who all collaborated with Henderson on both of her albums, as well as Jordan Riley who has co-writes and production credits across many of Henderson's standalone singles, features and Everything I Didn't Say. Henderson has also worked with British DJ Nathan Dawe, previously writing the song "Lighter" for him, and then collaborating in 2022 on Dawe's single "21 Reasons". That same year, Henderson was also co-lead artist on the song "Crazy What Love Can Do" with David Guetta and Becky Hill.

List of songs

Unreleased songs

Notes

References

Ella Henderson songs
Lists of songs recorded by British artists